Valle del Jerte is a comarca and mancomunidad in the province of Cáceres, Spain.  It contains the following municipalities:
 Barrado
 Cabezuela del Valle
 Cabrero
 Casas del Castañar
 El Torno
 Jerte
 Navaconcejo
 Piornal
 Rebollar
 Tornavacas
 Valdastillas

References 

Province of Cáceres
Comarcas of Extremadura